In the context of sheep, Dorset may refer to:

 the Dorset Down, a British sheep breed
 the Dorset Horn, a British sheep breed
 the Polish Modified Dorset, a Polish sheep breed developed at the University of Life Sciences in Poznań
 the Poll Dorset, an Australian sheep breed derived from the Dorset Horn
 the Polled Dorset, an American sheep breed derived from the Dorset Horn